James Cranswick Tory (October 24, 1862 – June 26, 1944) was a Nova Scotia businessman and politician. He was born in 1862 to Robert Kirk Tory and Anorah Ferguson in Guysborough County and lived in the village of Guysborough. He attended McGill University in Montreal and worked at Sun Life Assurance Company. In 1894, he married Caroline Whitman. Tory served as a Liberal MLA for Guysborough County in the Nova Scotia House of Assembly from 1911 to 1925. He was a minister without portfolio in the province's Executive Council from 1921 to 1925. Tory was appointed the 14th Lieutenant Governor of Nova Scotia and served from 1925 to 1930. He died in Halifax.

Tory's younger brothers were Henry Marshall Tory, founding president of the University of Alberta and the National Research Council of Canada, and John A. Tory Sr. (1869–1950).

A portrait of him hangs in the Tupper Building, Dalhouise University, Nova Scotia.

External links
 Tory Tory Tory
 Marble, AE Nova Scotians at home and abroad: biographical sketches ... (1977) p. 385 

1862 births
1944 deaths
Canadian people of English descent
Lieutenant Governors of Nova Scotia
Nova Scotia Liberal Party MLAs
People from Guysborough County, Nova Scotia
James Cranswick
McGill University alumni
Businesspeople from Nova Scotia